Giallombardo is an Italian surname. Notable people with the surname include:

Andrea Giallombardo (born 1980), Italian footballer
Bob Giallombardo (born 1937), American baseball player
Mauro Giallombardo (born 1989), Argentine racing driver
Mike Giallombardo (born 1982), American politician, businessman, and military officer

Italian-language surnames